Filyro (Greek: Φίλυρο) is a suburban village located 10 km northeast from the city of Thessaloniki, Greece. It is part of the municipality Pylaia–Chortiatis, and is located at the northwest end of Mount Chortiatis.

Populated places in Thessaloniki (regional unit)